The 2005 Illinois Fighting Illini football team represented the University of Illinois at Urbana–Champaign during the 2005 NCAA Division I-A football season. They participated as members of the Big Ten Conference. Their home games were played at Memorial Stadium in Champaign, Illinois. The team's head coach was Ron Zook, who was in his first season with the Illini.  Illinois had a record of 2–9.

Schedule

Roster

References

Illinois
Illinois Fighting Illini football seasons
Illinois Fighting Illini football